George Ralph Strugar (April 2, 1934June 13, 1997) was a professional American football player who played defensive tackle for eight seasons for the Los Angeles Rams, the Pittsburgh Steelers, and New York Titans/Jets.

External links
Death notice, New York Times 

1934 births
1997 deaths
People from Cle Elum, Washington
Players of American football from Washington (state)
American football defensive tackles
Washington Huskies football players
Los Angeles Rams players
Pittsburgh Steelers players
New York Titans (AFL) players
New York Jets players
Deaths from lung cancer
American Football League players